MALSU1 is a gene on chromosome 7 in humans that encodes the protein MALSU1.  This protein localizes to mitochondria and is probably involved in mitochondrial translation or the biogenesis of the large subunit of the mitochondrial ribosome.

Protein 

MALSU1 is a member of the DUF143 family (= domain of unknown function 143) which is highly conserved in both prokaryotes and eukaryotes but not archaea.  Examples of mammalian conservation are given below using the ALIGN tool from the San Diego Supercomputer Center Biology Workbench.  Percentages indicate the identity shared by the human protein and the respective mammalian protein.  Accession numbers are from the NCBI database.

There are no known or predicted paralogs in Homo sapiens. That is, MALSU1 is a single-copy gene.

The domain is from position 93 to 194 on the human protein and comprises 43.2% of the sequence.  This conserved domain is also present in the plant gene iojap, a pattern-striping gene in maize. However, since its function has been solved at least in bacteria, it is no longer a "domain of unknown function".

Protein function
While the function of the protein in mitochondria is not conclusive its bacterial homolog has been shown to silence bacterial translation by blocking the two ribosomal subunits from joining, hence it was called RsfS (= ribosomal silencing factor in starvation or stationary phase, a synonym of RsfA).

Protein-protein interactions. RsfS has been shown via a yeast two-hybrid screen to interact with ribosomal protein L14 in four bacterial species as well as in mitochondria. MALSU1 was shown to interact with CHMP protein which is part of the ESCRT-III complex (Endosomal Sorting Complex Required for Transport). DUF143 has also been shown to interact with UFD1, tRNA synthetases class II, and Cytidylyltransferase in various architectures.

Properties 

Bioinformatics predicted the following properties for LOC_115416:
 Molecular Weight:  26.2 KDal
 Isoelectric Point:  5.155

Gene 

C7ORF30 is located on chromosome 7 in humans and runs from 23,305,465 to 23,315,705.  There are four predicted exons in the human gene with conservation occurring across most mammalian species.  There is no conclusive data regarding whether the gene is ubiquitously expressed in human tissues, but expressed sequence tag databases show that it is expressed in many tissues.

Neighboring Genes 

MALSU1 is neighbored by GPNMB upstream and IGF2BP3 downstream, however the latter gene is transcribed on the opposite strand running from the 3' to the 5' end.  There is some slight overlap of the untranslated regions of C7ORF30 and IGF2BP3 whereas the distance between C7ORF30 and GPNMB is 24,211 base pairs.

References

External links